Wotan Wilke Möhring (born 23 May 1967) is a German actor.

Biography 
Möhring was born in Augustdorf near Detmold and grew up in Herne. His father was an army officer and his mother worked as a teacher. He has a sister and two brothers. One of them, Sönke Möhring, is also an actor.

After receiving a Waldorf education in Herne and finishing high school with the Abitur diploma, Möhring took vocational training to become an electrician, but then worked as a club owner, doorman, and model. He studied communication at the Berlin University of the Arts, joined actors workshops in Cologne and Los Angeles, and lived for two years in New York City. He was also an army officer for two years.

Together with Gabi Delgado-López, Möhring founded the band DAF/DOS. Furthermore, he has produced soundtracks.

Möhring had his first screen appearance in the 1998 television film , a bio-pic about a German boxer, which also featured Benno Fürmann and Götz George. Since then he has played in over 90 German film and television productions and has received numerous prizes, including the German Television Prize as Best Actor in 2012. He starred in the German film Der letzte schöne Tag which was awarded a Grimme Prize in 2013. He played the lead role in a short film directed by Max Zähle, which won a Student Academy Award in 2011 and was nominated for an Oscar in 2012. He had a small role in the international film production of 2008 titled Valkyrie about the plot to assassinate Hitler on 20 July 1944.

Since 2013, Möhring has played the detective Thorsten Falke in seventeen episodes as of June 2022 of the long-running crime television series Tatort, after previously playing guest roles four times in the series.

In 2016, he played the part of Old Shatterhand, the blood brother of Winnetou, in the German film production Winnetou based on three novels by Karl May.

Möhring plays the main character, Ludvig Licht, in the 2018 Swedish television thriller series West of Liberty, based on the novel by Thomas Engstrom.

Filmography (selection) 

1998:  (TV film)
1999: Zoe – Ted
1999: Bang Boom Bang – Fußballspieler – Kellerbar (scenes deleted)
1999: 
2000: 8 Grad Celsius – Mark
2000: Otto – Der Katastrofenfilm – Brock
2000: Hat er Arbeit? (TV film) – Karl Hansen
2001: Das Experiment – Joe Maier Nr. 69
2001: Ein göttlicher Job – Gangster
2001: Lammbock – Frank
2001: Julietta – Castor
2002: Olgas Sommer – Paul
2002: Himmelreich auf Erden (TV film) – Roland
2002: La mer
2002:  (TV film)
2003: Anatomy 2 – Gregor
2003: Eierdiebe – Martin Schwarz
2003: Echte Männer? (TV film) – Mike Krieger
2004: Die Konferenz (TV film) – Karsten Graf
2004: Zwischen Liebe und Tod (TV film) – Max
2004: Cowgirl – Max
2005: Küss mich, Hexe! (TV film) – Harry Tänzel
2005: Antibodies – Michael Martens
2005:  – Carlo
2005:  – Jan (35)
2005: Heimliche Liebe – Der Schüler und die Postbotin (TV film) – Peter Wörner
2006: Goldene Zeiten – Ingo Schmitz
2006: Mord auf Rezept (TV film) – Noah Becker
2006: Freundinnen fürs Leben (TV film) – Meier
2006:  – Jonas
2006: Bettis Bescherung (TV film) – Fabian Fuchs
2007:  – Horst
2007: Counterparts – Michael Gleiwitz
2007: Copacabana (TV film) – Harald
2007: Neben der Spur – Johannes
2008: Hardcover – Dominik 'Nick' 'Dom' Adler
2008: KDD – Kriminaldauerdienst (TV series) – Fred Steiner
2008: Ein riskantes Spiel (TV film) – Andreas
2008:  – Christoph Zach
2008: Valkyrie – Sergeant Kolbe
2008: Die Wilden Hühner und das Leben – Tortes Vater
2009: Kinder des Sturms (TV film) – Harald Bergmann
2009: Soul Kitchen – Thomas Neumann
2009: Pandorum – Young Bower's Father
2009: Men in the City – Roland Feldberg
2010: Wie Matrosen – Dennis Koch
2010: Henri 4 – Henri de Guise
2010: The Silence – Timo Friedrich
2011:  – Ralph Nester
2011: Gegengerade – Fan Steiger
2011: Raju (short) – Jan
2011:  (TV film) – Karl Erdmann
2011: Black Brown White – Doc
2011: Homevideo (TV film) – Claas Moormann
2011:  – Roland Feldberg
2011: The Last Fine Day (TV film) – Lars Langhoff
2012: Elmo: Wort des Tages – Wotan
2012: Life Is Not for Cowards – Markus
2012: Men Do What They Can – Paul Schuberth
2013:  (TV miniseries) – Friedrich Loewe
2013: Tatort – Feuerteufel (TV series) – Thorsten Falke
2014: Tatort – Kaltstart (TV series) – Thorsten Falke
2014:  – Carsten Rasmus
2014: Who Am I – No System is Safe – Stephan
2014:  – Hannes
2015:  – Paul
2015:  – Jakob
2016:  – Valentin
2016:  – Alex Paschke
2016:  – Basti
2016: Winnetou – Old Shatterhand
2017: Lommbock – Frank
2017:  – Fussel Poschka
2018: Don't. Get. Out! – Karl Brendt
2018: Parfum – Prosecutor Grünberg

Awards and nominations 
Hat er Arbeit? (2000)
 2002: German Television Award nomination for Best Actor
Liebe und Verrat (2002)
 2002: German Television Award nomination for Best Actor
Antikörper (2005)
 2005: Málaga Spanish Film Festival Award for Best Actor
The Fire (2011)
 2011: Thessaloniki Film Festival Award for Best Actor
Homevideo (2011)
 2011: German Television Award
The Last Fine Day (2011)
 2012: German Television Award for Best Actor
 2013: Grimme Award
 Winnetou (2016)
2017 Goldene Kamera Award for Best German Actor

References

External links 

 
 

1967 births
20th-century German male actors
21st-century German male actors
Actors from North Rhine-Westphalia
Berlin University of the Arts alumni
German male film actors
German male television actors
Living people
People from Detmold